GYB may refer to:
 Garus language, spoken in Papua New Guinea
 Giddings–Lee County Airport, in Texas, United States
 Gymnase intercantonal de la Broye, a secondary school in Payerne, Switzerland